Willians Astudillo (born October 14, 1991), nicknamed "La Tortuga", is a Venezuelan professional baseball utility player for the Fukuoka SoftBank Hawks of Nippon Professional Baseball (NPB). He made his MLB debut with the Minnesota Twins in 2018, and has appeared at every position except shortstop in a major league game.

Early life
Willians Astudillo was born in Barcelona, Venezuela, located on the country's Caribbean coast.  Astudillo's father, a professional baseball player in Venezuela, and his grandfather taught him from an early age how to play baseball.  Drills included flicking corn kernel projectiles for the young Astudillo to hit with a broomstick.

Career

Philadelphia Phillies
Astudillo signed his first professional baseball contract with the Philadelphia Phillies as an amateur free agent on December 15, 2008. In 2009, Astudillo made his professional debut for the VSL Phillies, and spent the following season with the team as well, hitting .250 and .312, respectively. He improved his performance for the team in 2011, slashing .361/.424/.449 in 52 games. He spent the 2012 season with the rookie-level Gulf Coast League Phillies, hitting .318/.327/.419 in 45 contests. Astudillo did not play in a game in 2013, and spent the 2014 season with the Single-A Lakewood BlueClaws, posting a slash line of .333/.366/.434 in 117 games. In 2015, he played for the High-A Clearwater Threshers, slashing .314/.348/.384 with 3 home runs and 49 RBI in 107 games. He elected free agency following the season on November 6, 2015.

Atlanta Braves
On November 19, 2015, Astudillo signed a minor league contract with the Atlanta Braves. He spent the 2016 season with the Double-A Mississippi Braves, batting .267/.293/.332 with 4 home runs and 30 RBI in 89 games. Astudillo elected free agency following the year on November 7, 2016.

Arizona Diamondbacks
On April 4, 2017, Astudillo signed a minor league contract with the Arizona Diamondbacks, and was assigned to the Triple-A Reno Aces. He spent the year with the Aces, posting a slash of .342/.370/.558 with 4 home runs and 22 RBI in 36 games. He elected free agency on November 6, 2017.

Minnesota Twins
On November 30, 2017, Astudillo signed a minor league deal with the Minnesota Twins and was assigned to the Triple-A Rochester Red Wings. Astudillo was called up to the majors for the first time on June 29, 2018.  He made his major league debut at Wrigley Field the following afternoon versus the Chicago Cubs as a defensive replacement in left field in the fifth inning, later switching to center field.  In the sixth inning, he singled on a ground ball to second base to score Robbie Grossman for his first major league hit.  On July 14, 2018, he made his major league pitching debut, completing the final inning of a 19–6 loss to the Tampa Bay Rays at Target Field.  He allowed five runs on five hits and two home runs for a 45.00 earned run average (ERA) in his lone pitching entry of the season.  Astudillo spent most of his playing time at catcher and third base and made other appearances at second base.  He appeared in 30 games total for the Twins in 2018, batting .355, .371 on-base percentage, .516 slugging percentage, three home runs, 21 RBI, two walks and three strikeouts over 93 plate appearances.

The Twins announced their selection of Astudillo for his first major league 25-man Opening Day roster on March 27, 2019, as one of five bench players.  One month later, he was placed on the injured list with a left hamstring strain.  He was batting .327 with two home runs. He ended the season hitting .268 in 58 games.

He has also played for the Caribes de Anzoátegui in the Venezuelan Professional Baseball League annually since the 2015–16 season.

Known for an extremely high contact rate, Astudillo produced eight of the 30 lowest strikeout rates with a minimum of 100 plate appearances according to Baseball Prospectus' catalog of over 42,000 individual seasons from 2005–2018.  He produced the lowest of all at 0.9% in Venezuela in 2011, second-lowest at 1.8% in Venezuela in 2010, and fourth-lowest at 2.4% in the Florida State League in 2015.

On July 3, 2020, it was announced that Astudillo had tested positive for COVID-19.
Astudillo appeared in just 8 games in 2020, gathering only 16 at-bats and batting .250/.250/.500 with 1 home run and 3 RBI. After the 2020 season, he played for Caribes de Anzoátegui of the Liga Venezolana de Béisbol Profesional (LVMP). He also played for Venezuela in the 2021 Caribbean Series.

He has thrice been a relief pitcher. On April 17, 2021, he took the Los Angeles Angels' 8th inning 1-2-3 in seven pitches, with his slowest tracked strike being at 46 mph. Two of his seven pitches were so slow that the radar gun failed to track them. He again pitched in relief on August 26, 2021, when he pitched a scoreless 8th inning against the Boston Red Sox. Astudillo ended the year hitting .236/.259/.375 with a career-high 7 home runs and 21 RBI in 72 games.

On November 19, 2021, the Twins designated Astudillo for assignment. He cleared waivers and was released on November 24.

Miami Marlins
On March 13, 2022, Astudillo signed a minor league contract with the Miami Marlins. He began the 2022 season with the Triple-A Jacksonville Jumbo Shrimp. 

On May 25, 2022, Astudillo was selected to the active roster. He made his Marlins debut that same day against the Tampa Bay Rays. Astudillo was the winning run for the Marlins' contest against the Washington Nationals on June 8, scoring from second base in the bottom of the 10th inning. He was designated for assignment on June 26 and was sent outright to Triple-A. On July 24, the Marlins selected his contract and he was promoted to the major leagues. He was designated for assignment on July 29. He elected free agency on October 6, 2022.

Fukuoka SoftBank Hawks 
On November 11, 2022, Japanese media reported that Astudillo was signing with the Fukuoka SoftBank Hawks of Nippon Professional Baseball.

Playing style
Several prevalent distinctions about Astudillo have helped create popularity with fans: his non-athletic build, multi-positional flexibility, and a highly aggressive batting style that yields few strikeouts or walks. I was too short. I was too stocky. I did not have the physical traits customary associated with a Major League player,” he noted on Instagram.  “Well here I am.”

Combining his professional careers in both the American minor leagues and Venezuela, Astudillo has played at every position except shortstop.  He then accomplished the same feat within his first two major league seasons.  Twins chief baseball officer Derek Falvey commented that team scouts were perplexed by Astudillo as projection systems failed to find any closely comparable hitters, and were also amused when he informed them that he could play center field.  To prove it, Astudillo played footage of himself robbing a home run in a Venezuelan winter league game.

In an era notable for its rising strikeout rates and where high walk rates are prized, Astudillo's aggressive batting approach yields an unusually low number of both.  In his minor league career through the 2018 season, he had put the ball in play in 2,400 of 2,571 plate appearances.

Personal life
His brother, Wilfred, is also a professional baseball player.

See also

 List of Major League Baseball players from Venezuela

References

External links

1991 births
Living people
Caribes de Anzoátegui players
Clearwater Threshers players
Florida Complex League Phillies players
Lakewood BlueClaws players
Major League Baseball catchers
Major League Baseball first basemen
Major League Baseball players from Venezuela
Major League Baseball third basemen
Miami Marlins players
Minnesota Twins players
Mississippi Braves players
People from Barcelona, Venezuela
Reno Aces players
Rochester Red Wings players
St. Paul Saints players
Venezuelan expatriate baseball players in the United States
Venezuelan Summer League Phillies players
Jacksonville Jumbo Shrimp players